Clemens Bieber (born 26 January 1956) is a German operatic tenor.

Life 
Born in Würzburg, Bieber completed his vocal studies at the Hochschule für Musik in his hometown with Adalbert Kraus and Horst Laubenthal.

From 1986 to 1988, he was engaged as a lyrical tenor at the Saarländisches Staatstheater in Saarbrücken. Since 1988 he is engaged at the Deutsche Oper Berlin.

In the years 1987 to 1995 and from 2001, he sang as a soloist with the Bayreuth Festival.

In 2010, he was appointed Berlin Kammersänger.

Bieber also works as a concert singer. His repertoire includes the main works of Bach, Händel, Beethoven, Haydn, Mozart, Mendelssohn and Verdi. As a Bach interpreter he is the evangelist in the passions and soloist in cantatas.

References

External links 
 
 

German operatic tenors
1956 births
Living people
People from Würzburg
20th-century German male  opera singers
21st-century German  male opera singers